The explosion at Hotel Jørgensen was a minor explosion inside of the discount hostel of the same name in central Copenhagen, Denmark. The explosion happened at 1:23 pm on 10 September 2010. No fatalities were recorded. The only injured person was the one-legged Chechnyan-Belgian bomber Lors Doukaiev, who was caught in a nearby park, Ørstedsparken, following the explosion, but only identified several days later.

Doukaiev has been confirmed by the German security agency Verfassungsschutz to have maintained close contacts with Islamic extremists in the German city of Bremen.

Investigation
Considering that the bomber bought a bus ticket to Belgium with departure from Denmark on 10 September, and he was seen at a post office buying a small box used for mailing CDs, as well as a roll of tape, it is believed that it was not meant to be a suicide attack against the hostel, but rather an accident while making a letter bomb, which happened as a consequence of Doukaiev's use of a highly volatile explosive substance.

Lors Doukaiev was also seen in a video game shop, buying a game whose case he could have intended to use as a container for the bomb.

The Danish police revealed a hypothesis regarding the purpose of the bomb. According to the police hypothesis, Lors Doukaiev constructed a letter bomb, which was meant to explode upon opening. The bomb would have the same effect as a fragmentation grenade. It is speculated, that Jyllands-Posten in Århus would have been the target of said letter bomb.

Despite Lors Doukaiev's continued claims of innocence, a unanimous panel of judges found him guilty of attempted terrorism, and on 31 May 2011 he was sentenced to 12 years in prison. In April 2013, he was extradited to Belgium.

References

Explosions in 2010
2010 crimes in Denmark
Explosions in Denmark
Islamic terrorism in Denmark
Islamic terrorist incidents in 2010
Terrorist incidents in Europe in 2010
Attacks on hotels in Europe
2010 in Copenhagen
Crime in Copenhagen
Failed terrorist attempts in Denmark
September 2010 crimes
September 2010 events in Europe
Events in Copenhagen
Terrorist incidents in Denmark in the 2010s
Hotel bombings